Maud Hansson (5 December 1937 – 1 October 2020) was a Swedish film actress. She appeared in 20 films between 1956 and 1991. Her filmography includes supporting roles in the Ingmar Bergman films The Seventh Seal and Wild Strawberries (both 1957) as well as her portrayal of the slightly naive maid Lina in the Emil of Lönneberga films (1971–1973) based on Astrid Lindgren's books.

Selected filmography

References

External links

 

1937 births
2020 deaths
Swedish film actresses
Actresses from Stockholm
20th-century Swedish actresses